Five Live is an EP released in 1993, featuring five (in some countries, where it is considered to be a reduced-length long-playing album, six) tracks, performed by George Michael, Queen, and Lisa Stansfield. "Somebody to Love" and "These Are the Days of Our Lives" (both also available on video) were recorded at the Freddie Mercury Tribute Concert, held on 20 April 1992, at Wembley Stadium.

All proceeds from the sale of the EP benefited the Mercury Phoenix Trust. Sales of the record were very strong throughout Europe, where it debuted at number one on the UK Singles Chart, and several European countries, either considered as a single, or charting on album charts as an extended play or an LP. Chart success in the U.S. was far less spectacular, but the EP still peaked at number 46 on the Billboard 200.

A shortened version of "Killer" and "Papa Was a Rollin' Stone", a live medley performed by Michael at Wembley Arena, was released as a further independent single, in some territories only. The singer also shot a music video for it, but did not personally appear in full face (it was during the time Michael refused to exploit his outward look, which he thought would distract the audience from the music, his main concern). The video was directed by Marcus Nispel.

While "These Are the Days of Our Lives" is played by the remaining members of Queen, the vocal is a duet between George Michael and Lisa Stansfield.

The sixth track - only featured on some versions of the release - is represented by a short performance by Queen, entitled "Dear Friends", originally sung by Freddie Mercury. Recorded in 1974 and originally appearing on the band's Sheer Heart Attack album, this constitutes the one studio recording on the record. It was not included in the UK vinyl of the EP.

Usually, countries where the six-track work is distributed consider it to be a short LP, whereas those where the five-track (hence its title) work is available generally tend to see it as an EP or even (if "Killer"/"Papa Was a Rollin' Stone" was not marketed independently in those same territories) as a particularly long or content-rich single.

Track listing
"Somebody to Love" (Freddie Mercury) – 5:17 (US #30)
Performed by Queen and George Michael
Recorded at Wembley Stadium on 20 April 1992
"Killer" (Adam Tinley, Seal-Henry Samuel)/Papa Was a Rollin' Stone" (Norman Whitfield, Barrett Strong) – 4:28 (US #69)
Performed by George Michael
Recorded at Wembley Arena on 22 March 1991
"These Are the Days of Our Lives" (Queen) – 4:43
Performed by Queen, George Michael and Lisa Stansfield
Recorded at Wembley Stadium on 20 April 1992
"Calling You" (Bob Telson) – 6:17
Performed by George Michael
Recorded at Wembley Arena on 22 March 1991
"Dear Friends" (Brian May) – 1:07 (some releases only)
Performed by Queen (1974 studio recording from Sheer Heart Attack)

Charts

Weekly charts

Year-end charts

Certifications

Release history

References

1993 debut EPs
Live EPs
George Michael albums
Queen (band) live albums
Irish Singles Chart number-one singles
Number-one singles in Spain
UK Singles Chart number-one singles
Parlophone live albums
Parlophone EPs
Live albums recorded at Wembley Stadium
Lisa Stansfield